Anita Louise (born Anita Louise Fremault; January 9, 1915 – April 25, 1970) was an American film and television actress best known for her performances in A Midsummer Night's Dream (1935), The Story of Louis Pasteur (1935),  Anthony Adverse (1936),  Marie Antoinette (1938), and The Little Princess (1939). She was named as a WAMPAS Baby Star.

Louise had delicate features and blonde hair, with ageless grace, which saw her through 30 years in film, beginning as a child actress before becoming a featured player during Hollywood's Golden Age.

Life and career
Louise was born on January 9, 1915, in New York City, the daughter of Louis Fremault and Ann Fremault.

She attended the Professional Children's School. She made her acting debut on Broadway at the age of seven, in Peter Ibbetson. Within a year, she was appearing regularly in Hollywood films. By her late teens, she was cast in leading and supporting roles in major productions and was highly regarded for her delicate features and blonde hair.

At age seven, Louise appeared in the film Down to the Sea in Ships (1922). She made her first credited screen debut at the age of nine in the film The Sixth Commandment (1924). In 1929, Louise dropped her surname, billing herself only by first and second names. 

As her stature in Hollywood grew, she was named a WAMPAS Baby Star. Her reputation was enhanced by her role as Hollywood society hostess, with her parties attended by the elite of Hollywood and widely and regularly reported in the news media. 

Among her film successes were Just Like Heaven, Madame Du Barry (1934), A Midsummer Night's Dream (1935), The Story of Louis Pasteur (1935), Anthony Adverse (1936), Marie Antoinette (1938), The Sisters (1938), and The Little Princess (1939).

By the 1940s, she was reduced to mostly secondary roles, and her film career started to slow. Some of her films during this time are Casanova Brown (1944), Nine Girls (1944), The Bandit of Sherwood Forest (1946), Blondie's Big Moment (1947), and Bulldog Drummond at Bay (1947). Her last appearance in movies was in the 1952 war film Retreat, Hell!. Louise was reduced to minor roles and acted very infrequently until the advent of television in the 1950s provided her with further opportunities. In middle age, she played one of her more widely seen roles as the gentle mother Nell McLaughlin in the television series My Friend Flicka from 1956 to 1957, with co-stars Johnny Washbrook, Gene Evans, and Frank Ferguson. Louise was also the substitute host of The Loretta Young Show (1953) when Loretta Young was recuperating from surgery. In 1957, she was host of Theater Time on ABC-TV. Other shows Anita hosted include The United States Steel Hour (1962) and Playhouse 90 (1957). Her last television appearance was in a 1970 episode of the Mod Squad.

Personal life and death
Louise virtually retired after My Friend Flicka, which was rebroadcast thereafter for a generation. Her husband, film producer Buddy Adler, whom she married on May 18, 1940, died in 1960. They had two children. She married Henry Berger in 1962. Louise died of a stroke on April 25, 1970, in Los Angeles, California. She was buried next to Adler at the Forest Lawn Memorial Park in Glendale, California. She was 55 years old.

Louise has a star at 6821 Hollywood Boulevard in the Motion Pictures section of the Hollywood Walk of Fame in recognition of her contribution to films.

A Republican, she supported Dwight Eisenhower's campaign during the 1952 presidential election.

Filmography

Film

Television

References

External links

 
 
 Anita Louise at the TCM Movie Database
 Photographs and literature

1915 births
1970 deaths
American film actresses
American television actresses
Burials at Forest Lawn Memorial Park (Glendale)
Actresses from New York City
American child actresses
20th-century American actresses
Warner Bros. contract players
New York (state) Republicans
California Republicans
WAMPAS Baby Stars